Hermann Collitz (4 February 1855 – 13 May 1935) was an eminent German historical linguist and Indo-Europeanist, who spent much of his career in the United States.

Biography
Born in Bleckede near Lüneburg in 1885. Collitz received a doctorate in 1878 at the University of Göttingen with a dissertation on "The Emergence of the Indo-Iranian Palatal Series" (German: Die Entstehung der indoiranischen Palatalreihe), and his 1885 habilitation degree at the University of Halle for "The Inflection of Nouns with Threefold Gradation in Old Indic and in Greek: the Cases of the Singular" (German: Die Flexion der Nomina mit dreifacher Stammabstufung im Altindischen und im Griechischen – Die Casus des Singular).

In 1886, Collitz emigrated to the United States, where he taught at Bryn Mawr College in Philadelphia. In 1907, he moved to Johns Hopkins University in Baltimore, Maryland, where he took up a chair in Germanic studies. He was elected as a member to the American Philosophical Society in 1902.

In 1924, Collitz was elected the first president of the Linguistic Society of America. In 1927, he officially retired from Johns Hopkins, but remained in Baltimore until his death in 1935.

On 13 August 1904, he married Klara Hechtenberg, a fellow German-born philologist. Upon her death, in 1944, she left most of her estate to the Linguistic Society of America to found the Hermann and Klara H. Collitz Professorship in Comparative Philology. She left her husband's papers to Johns Hopkins University.

Selected works
He published: 
 Sammlung der griechischen Dialektinschriften (1884–1909; with Friedrich Bechtel)
 Die Verwandtschaftsverhältnisse der griechischen Dialekte (1895)
 Die neueste Sprachforschung (1886)

See also:
 World Languages in PMLA, Vol. 40, Appendix (1925), pp. xliii-lv, published by Modern Language Association
 "Hermann Collitz", in German Life magazine, December 2014/January 2015, p. 57

References

External links
Hermann Collitz Catalogus Professorum Halensis (biography in German)

1855 births
1935 deaths
Linguists from the United States
Linguists from Germany
People from Bleckede
Linguistic Society of America presidents
Presidents of the Modern Language Association